Kaitha  is a village in Ramgarh district of Jharkhand state of India.

References

Villages in Ramgarh district